The Military ranks of Philippines are the military insignia used by the Armed Forces of the Philippines.

Introduction 
 
The current Philippine military ranks are inspired partially by the very first military insignia used by the military forces during the Philippine Revolution of 1896 and the Philippine–American War, and the insignia used by the Philippine Constabulary raised in 1902 during the final days of the Philippine–American War, which was basically the same style of insignia used by the United States Army at that time. Elements of both the US army ranks and the old Philippine Army appear in the current ranks; this was reflected at the general officers insignia and enlisted ranks that resembled those of the US military (the silver stars used by generals and admirals were used by field grade officers in the First Republic), the field officers [like colonels], whose insignia are suns, use those insignia used by general officers of the Revolutionary Army. Company rank insignia[i.e. captain], consisting of a silver triangle, are a recent creation. Both company grade and field grade officer insignia have the baybayin letter ka ( K) in the middle, another throwback to the days of the war for independence, and even in the medal used by second-level members of the Katipunan during meetings, in which the letter is in the center.

Current ranks 
The current AFP insignia used today are a modification of the system first used in 1954–55 as part of the Filipinization of the military forces by then President and former Secretary of National Defense Ramon Magsaysay, ending years of the US-styled rank system in place since 1935. Prior to that period, the Philippines used the same rank insignia of the United States Armed Forces with modifications for Philippine conditions.

Commissioned officer ranks 
The rank insignia of commissioned officers.

Enlisted personnel ranks 
The rank insignia of non-commissioned officers and enlisted personnel.

Historic ranks

Revolutionary Army ranks 

These rank insignia for the nascent army were created in late 1896, replacing the earlier rank insignia used by the Katipuneros containing the letter K (ka). Ranks were then worn on the sleeves of all uniforms.

Shoulder epaulette insignia was introduced in late 1898, some time after the declaration of Philippine independence. It is worthy of mention that the insignia for the rank of Second Lieutenant and Major has three silver and gold stars, respectively, and the number of stars are reduced when promoted.

Officers

Enlisted Personnel

Rank insignia during the Commonwealth and immediate independence period 
The Philippine Army during the Commonwealth period as well as after independence used essentially the same rank insignias as the United States Army. The main difference is the addition of a rank named third lieutenant and the five-star rank of Field Marshal.

See also 
 Armed Forces of the Philippines

References